Olimjon Masaliyevich Ashirov (Alim Ashirov; 25 January 1955 in Tashkent – 11 August 1979 in Dniprodzerzhynsk, Ukraine SSR) was a Soviet footballer.  Ashirov played for Pakhtakor Tashkent as a defender from 1972 to 1979, before he died in a mid-air plane crash in August 1979.  He was classified as a Master of Sport of the USSR in 1979.

External links
Player statistics on KLISF

1955 births
1979 deaths
Sportspeople from Tashkent
Uzbekistani footballers
Pakhtakor Tashkent FK players
Victims of aviation accidents or incidents in the Soviet Union
Victims of aviation accidents or incidents in Ukraine
Association football defenders
Soviet footballers